North Canton is a city in central Stark County, Ohio, United States. The population was 17,842 at the 2020 census. It is a suburb of the Canton–Massillon metropolitan area.

History
In 1831, the Community of North Canton first began as the Village of New Berlin. Residents were primarily of German descent. William H. “Boss” Hoover moved his tannery business from the family farm to the center of the North Canton village in 1873. In 1908, Hoover began manufacturing vacuum cleaners. During World War I, it became unfashionable to be associated with anything German so in 1918, the community changed the name of the village to North Canton. The Hoover Company became the world's largest manufacturer of vacuum cleaners in 1933. The North Canton Jaycees were formed in 1951. In 2007, the Hoover Company officially shut down. The Hoover Company's old building was bought in 2010 for residential, educational, and recreational purposes. The old Hoover Company building was sold by sections in 2013 to be transformed into a mall and apartments.

Geography
The West Branch of Nimishillen Creek flows through the city.

Demographics

2010 census
As of the census of 2010, there were 17,488 people, 7,557 households, and 4,426 families living in the city. The racial makeup of the city was 94.8% White, 2.0% African American, 0.2% Native American, 1.1% Asian, 0.3% from other races, and 1.5% from two or more races. Hispanic or Latino of any race were 1.5% of the population.

There were 7,557 households, of which 23.9% had children under the age of 18 living with them, 46.2% were married couples living together, 9.2% had a female householder with no husband present, 3.1% had a male householder with no wife present, and 41.4% were non-families. 36.3% of all households were made up of individuals, and 17.2% had someone living alone who was 65 years of age or older. The average household size was 2.15 and the average family size was 2.82.

The median age in the city was 42.5 years. 18.6% of residents were under the age of 18; 12.2% were between the ages of 18 and 24; 21.8% were from 25 to 44; 25.8% were from 45 to 64; and 21.5% were 65 years of age or older. The gender makeup of the city was 46.3% male and 53.7% female.

Of the city's population over the age of 25, 34.3% hold a bachelor's degree or higher.

2000 census
As of the census of 2000 (jobs), there were 16,369 people, 7,114 households, and 4,382 families living in the city. The population density was 2,697.1 people per square mile (1,041.2/km2). There were 7,506 housing units at an average density of 1,236.8 per square mile (477.4/km2). The racial makeup of the city was 96.90% White, 1.12% African American, 0.07% Native American, 1.04% Asian, 0.18% from other races, and 0.69% from two or more races. Hispanic or Latino of any race were 0.82% of the population.

There were 7,114 households, out of which 23.5% had children under the age of 18 living with them, 51.7% were married couples living together, 7.5% had a female householder with no husband present, and 38.4% were non-families. 33.8% of all households were made up of individuals, and 15.2% had someone living alone who was 65 years of age or older. The average household size was 2.18 and the average family size was 2.80.

In the city, the population was spread out, with 19.3% under the age of 18, 9.5% from 18 to 24, 25.1% from 25 to 44, 23.6% from 45 to 64, and 22.6% who were 65 years of age or older. The median age was 42 years. For every 100 females, there were 87.5 males. For every 100 females age 18 and over, there were 83.1 males.

The median income for a household in the city was $42,013, and the median income for a family was $53,268. Males had a median income of $39,517 versus $29,250 for females. The per capita income for the city was $24,045. About 3.5% of families and 5.7% of the population were below the poverty line, including 7.7% of those under age 18 and 5.6% of those age 65 or over.

Education
Most students attend North Canton City Schools, which consists of Clearmount and Northwood elementary schools and Greentown and Orchard Hill intermediate schools, plus North Canton Middle School and North Canton Hoover High School. Also in the city limits is St. Paul School, that offers a private, parochial education, in the Catholic tradition, for students in grades K-8.

Walsh University is a private, Catholic university that offers undergraduate and graduate degrees. Enrollment is about 2,500. Men's and women's athletic teams are members of the NCAA Division II and Great Lakes Intercollegiate Athletic Conference.

Plain Local Schools and Jackson Local Schools also exist in the 44720 zip code.

Notable people
 Todd Blackledge, National Football League player and television sports analyst
 Joe DeRosa, an official in the National Basketball Association
 Jehu Grubb, pioneer settler and politician
 Diana Al-Hadid, Syrian-born American artist
 Marty Lee Hoenes, rock musician
 Ray Kolp, Major League Baseball player
 Eddie McClintock, actor
 Tony Migliozzi, ultra-marathoner and 2015 IAU 50 km World Champion
 Jeffrey Mylett, actor and songwriter
 Dick Snyder, National Basketball Association player
 Rabbit Warstler, Major League Baseball player

References

External links

 City website

Cities in Stark County, Ohio
German-American culture in Ohio
Cities in Ohio
1831 establishments in Ohio